Murat Sağlam (born 10 April 1998) is a professional footballer. Born in Germany, he represents Turkey internationally.

Playing career
On 15 June 2019, signed a professional contract with Fenerbahçe. Sağlam made his professional debut with Fenerbahçe in a 2-1 Süper Lig win over Göztepe S.K. on 4 July 2020.

References

External links
 
 
 Mackolik Profile
 DFB Profile

1998 births
Living people
People from Hamelin
Turkish footballers
Turkey youth international footballers
German footballers
German people of Turkish descent
Association football midfielders
Association football fullbacks
Fenerbahçe S.K. footballers
VfL Wolfsburg II players
Süper Lig players
Regionalliga players
Footballers from Lower Saxony